Idaho County is a county in the U.S. state of Idaho, and the largest by area in the state. As of the 2020 census, the population was 16,541. The county seat is Grangeville. Previous county seats of the area were Florence (1864–68), Washington (1868–75), and Mount Idaho (1875–1902).

History
Idaho County's oldest non-native settlements are ghost towns. Discovery of gold occurred in succession at Elk City, Newsome, and Florence during the spring and summer of 1861. At the time, all of the settlements were within Shoshone County, Washington Territory.  Thousands flocked to Florence.  As a result, Idaho County was founded  as a region of Washington Territory in 1861, named for a steamer called Idaho that was launched on the Columbia River in 1860. It was reorganized by the Idaho Territorial Legislature on February 4, 1864. In this context, the Idaho Territory and the State of Idaho are both preceded by the county name.

Settlements at Cottonwood, Mount Idaho, and Warrens were established in 1862.  The Warrens settlement was a fractured settlement as a result of settlement there by both Union and Confederate affiliated miners.  The Union affiliated miners on the northern edge of the settlement named their portion of the settlement Washington while the Confederate affiliated miners named their portion Richmond.  Richmond dwindled by 1866 and Washington went on to become the county seat in 1868 and was the name of the settlement used in most government documents during the period of settlement.  Out of all these settlements, only Cottonwood went on to eventually become one of Idaho County's seven incorporated cities.

Idaho Territory conducted a census in 1863 and another in 1864.  Population data was returned for both years for Warrens (660/521), Florence (575/254), Elk City (372/219), Slate Creek (216/117), Clearwater Station (212/76), and Newsome (62/24).  For 1864, data was also returned for the settlements of Mount Idaho (74), Miller's Camp (36), and Cottonwood (17).  Between 1863 and 1864, Idaho County saw a decrease from 1,601 residents to 955.

Settlement at White Bird occurred some time prior to 1870 as a precinct under the same name is listed with 71 inhabitants at the 1870 census.  Efforts to force White Bird's band of Nez Perce tribesmen to the Nez Perce Reservation led to the Battle of White Bird Canyon in 1877. The town was established in 1891.

Grangeville emerged as a town at the 1880 census with 129 residents. It was incorporated as a city in 1904.  Ferdinand and Kooskia were settled starting in 1895 and along with Cottonwood and Stites, were all incorporated prior to 1920.  Development of Riggins started prior to 1930 with Riggins Village being incorporated in 1948.

Idaho County's boundaries have changed more times than any other Idaho's county with changes occurring on 20 separate dates over the county's first 57 years.  The majority of those changes were from boundary realignment with only three counties taking territory from Idaho County at their creation.  Originating at 75,789 square miles, its original boundary under Washington Territory contained the southern portion of Idaho County, Idaho's 34 southern counties, part of Ravalli County, Montana, and parts of Fremont, Lincoln, Park, Sublette, and Teton counties in Wyoming. Boise was partitioned off in January 1863 with the Payette River being the primary dividing line.  In 1864, two separate acts transferred the portion in Montana to Missoula County, established the southern boundary at 44° 30' latitude, and made slight adjustments in the northern boundary to define the county as one of Idaho Territory's seven original counties. Three boundary adjustments were made with Nez Perce and Ada between 1866 and 1867 and Lemhi was created in 1869 from territory east of the junction of the Middle Fork and main Salmon Rivers.  In 1873, the southern border was moved north to the divide between the main Salmon River with the Payette River and Middle Fork of Salmon River, bringing the county to its smallest historical land area of 2,901 square miles.  The boundary adjustment of 1875 created a county very similar to present Idaho County containing an area of 8,165 square miles.  Between 1879 and 1885, one change added territory on the Camas Prairie from Nez Perce while another brought back territory in present-day Adams, Valley, Custer, and Lemhi counties in the south.  In 1887, territory was exchanged with Boise County dividing present Valley County between the two counties.  One change in 1889 transferred territory to Custer County while another change finalized the county's northern border at its present location.  The southern border began to take shape after two changes in 1891 and 1895 exchanged territory between Washington and Idaho counties.  Adjustments with Lemhi in 1903 and 1911 and the creation of Valley County in 1918 brought the county to its present boundary.

Idaho County is one of seven counties in the United States that has the same name as the state in which it lies. The other six are Arkansas, Hawaii, Iowa, New York, Oklahoma, and Utah.

Geography
It is the largest county by area in Idaho. The southeast portion of the Nez Perce Indian Reservation is in the county's northwest corner. Due to the county's size, it is the only county that touches Oregon and Montana.

Adjacent counties

Clearwater County – north
Missoula County, Montana – northeast
Ravalli County, Montana – east
Lemhi County – southeast
Valley County – south
Adams County – southwest
Wallowa County, Oregon – west
Nez Perce County – northwest
Lewis County – northwest

National protected areas

 Bitterroot National Forest – (part)
 Clearwater National Forest – (part)
 Frank Church-River of No Return Wilderness – (part)
 Gospel Hump Wilderness
 Hells Canyon National Recreation Area – (part)
 Hells Canyon Wilderness – (part)
 Nez Perce National Forest
 Nez Perce National Historical Park – (part)
 Payette National Forest – (part)
 Salmon-Challis National Forest – (part)
 Selway-Bitterroot Wilderness – (part)
 Wallowa–Whitman National Forest – (part)

There are 4,431,720 acres (17,934.535 km2, or 6,924.563 sq mi) of National Forest land within the county, more than in any county (or borough) outside of Alaska. National Forests and their acreage within the county are: Nez Perce National Forest 2,224,091; Clearwater National Forest 870,807; Payette National Forest 804,853; Bitterroot National Forest 464,108; Salmon National Forest 66,074; and Wallowa National Forest 1,787. The Nez Perce National Forest is located entirely within the county's borders, and is the largest National Forest lying within a single county.

Time zones

Idaho County is one of the few counties in the United States with two time zones, divided by the Salmon River.  Most of the county is in the Pacific Time Zone, but those areas south of the Salmon River are in the Mountain Time Zone.

Transportation

Major highways

 – US 12
 – US 95

Airports

 Chamberlain USFS Airport (U79) – Chamberlain Guard Station
 Cold Meadows USFS Airport (U81) – Cold Meadows Guard Station
 Cottonwood Municipal Airport (S84) – Cottonwood
 Dixie USFS Airport (A05) – Dixie
 Wilson Bar USFS Airport (C48) – Dixie
 Elk City Airport (S90) – Elk City
 Fish Lake USFS Airport (S92) – Fish Lake
 Idaho County Airport (S80) – Grangeville
 Kamiah Municipal Airport (S73) – Kamiah
 Kooskia Municipal Airport (S82) – Kooskia
 Moose Creek USFS Airport (1U1) – Moose Creek Ranger Station
 Orogrande Airport (USFS) (75C) – Orogrande
 Shearer USFS Airport (2U5) – Shearer
 Slate Creek Airport (1S7) – Slate Creek
 Warren USFS Airport (3U1) – Warren

Demographics

2000 census
As of the census of 2000, there were 15,511 people, 6,084 households, and 4,295 families living in the county.  The population density was 2 people per square mile (1/km2).  There were 7,537 housing units at an average density of 1 per square mile (0/km2).  The racial makeup of the county was 94.12% White, 0.08% Black or African American, 2.89% Native American, 0.26% Asian, 0.02% Pacific Islander, 0.91% from other races, and 1.72% from two or more races.  1.57% of the population were Hispanic or Latino of any race. 29.7% were of German, 12.9% American, 11.7% English and 9.0% Irish ancestry.

There were 6,084 households, out of which 29.20% had children under the age of 18 living with them, 60.80% were married couples living together, 6.30% had a female householder with no husband present, and 29.40% were non-families. 25.30% of all households were made up of individuals, and 11.70% had someone living alone who was 65 years of age or older.  The average household size was 2.46 and the average family size was 2.95.

In the county, the population was spread out, with 25.00% under the age of 18, 6.30% from 18 to 24, 23.30% from 25 to 44, 28.40% from 45 to 64, and 17.00% who were 65 years of age or older.  The median age was 42 years. For every 100 females there were 103.60 males.  For every 100 females age 18 and over, there were 104.90 males.

The median income for a household in the county was $29,515, and the median income for a family was $33,919. Males had a median income of $28,383 versus $18,214 for females. The per capita income for the county was $14,411.  About 12.50% of families and 16.30% of the population were below the poverty line, including 21.00% of those under age 18 and 10.00% of those age 65 or over.

2010 census
As of the 2010 United States Census, there were 16,267 people, 6,834 households, and 4,536 families living in the county. The racial makeup of the county was 93.8% white, 3.0% American Indian, 0.4% Asian, 0.3% black or African American, 0.6% from other races, and 1.9% from two or more races. Those of Hispanic or Latino origin made up 2.6% of the population. In terms of ancestry, 39.8% were German, 16.6% were Irish, 15.0% were English, and 3.0% were American.

Of the 6,834 households, 24.4% had children under the age of 18 living with them, 55.7% were married couples living together, 6.6% had a female householder with no husband present, 33.6% were non-families, and 28.6% of all households were made up of individuals. The average household size was 2.30 and the average family size was 2.81. The median age was 48.0 years.

The median income for a household in the county was $34,536 and the median income for a family was $39,263. Males had a median income of $36,885 versus $25,982 for females. The per capita income for the county was $18,980. About 12.7% of families and 19.1% of the population were below the poverty line, including 28.7% of those under age 18 and 10.4% of those age 65 or over.

Communities

Cities

Cottonwood
Ferdinand
Grangeville
Kooskia
Riggins 
Stites
White Bird

Census-designated place
 Elk City

Unincorporated communities

 Burgdorf
 Clearwater
 Dixie
 Fenn
 Golden
 Greencreek
 Harpster
 Lowell
 Lucile
 Orogrande
 Pollock
 Syringa
 Warren

Ghost town
 Mount Idaho

Politics

See also
National Register of Historic Places listings in Idaho County, Idaho

Footnotes

Further reading
 John M. Henderson and William S. Shiach, with Harry B. Averill, An Illustrated History of North Idaho: Embracing Nez Perces, Idaho, Latah, Kootenai and Shoshone Counties, State of Idaho. n.c. [Chicago]: Western Historical Publishing Co., 1903.

External links

State of Idaho official site – Idaho County

 

 
Idaho counties
1864 establishments in Idaho Territory
Counties in multiple time zones
Populated places established in 1864